Patrick Jeffrey Elias Malone (March 17, 1888 – March 22, 1981) was a Canadian professional ice hockey player. Malone played for the Montreal Wanderers and the Quebec Bulldogs as a spare player. He was the older brother of the more famous Joe Malone, who is a member of the Hockey Hall of Fame. Jeff won the Stanley Cup with his brother in 1913 playing as a spare center for Quebec. He was likely the last living member of the Bulldogs.

His nephew Cliff Malone played three games in the National Hockey League for the Montreal Canadiens during the 1951–52 season.

He was second cousin of Sarsfield and Foster Malone who played briefly in the NHA.

Citations

References

External links
 

1888 births
1981 deaths
Anglophone Quebec people
Canadian ice hockey centres
Ice hockey people from Quebec City
Montreal Wanderers (NHA) players
Quebec Bulldogs (NHA) players
Stanley Cup champions